Amos Adams Lawrence (July 31, 1814August 22, 1886) was an American businessman, philanthropist, and social activist. He was a key figure in the United States abolitionist movement in the years leading up to the Civil War and the growth of the Episcopal Church in Massachusetts. He was instrumental in the establishment of the University of Kansas and Lawrence University in Appleton, Wisconsin.

Early life
Lawrence was born in Boston, Massachusetts on July 31, 1814. His father, Amos Lawrence, was a merchant, philanthropist, and member of the prominent Lawrence family.

He was educated at Groton Academy and was graduated at Harvard College in 1835.

Career
Following his graduation from Harvard, Lawrence entered business for himself as a commission merchant and eventually became owner of Ipswich Mills, the largest producer of knit goods in the country.

In 1858 and 1860, he was a candidate for governor of Massachusetts.

Philanthropy
Lawrence financed the founding of the University of Kansas in Lawrence, Kansas, which was named after him.

Some of the land he purchased became Appleton, Wisconsin, named for his father-in-law.

His farm outside of Boston became the campus for Boston College. From 1857 to 1862 he was treasurer of Harvard College, and from 1879 to 1885 an overseer. Lawrence also contributed large sums of money to Harvard, the Episcopal Theological School in Cambridge, Massachusetts, Lawrence Academy, and the Groton School.

Abolitionism and the Civil War
Lawrence credited the Anthony Burns affair in the spring of 1854 with radicalizing him and other cotton merchants on the issue of slavery: "[W]e went to bed one night old fashioned, conservative, Compromise Union Whigs & waked up stark mad Abolitionists."

Lawrence contributed large amounts of capital to the Massachusetts Emigrant Aid Company and funds for the colonization of free negroes in Liberia. He donated guns, specifically Sharps rifles, which were shipped to Jayhawkers and abolitionists in Kansas as "books" and "primers." During the bloodshed in Kansas, Lawrence wrote frequently to President Franklin Pierce, the husband of Lawrence’s cousin Jane, on behalf of the free-state settlers.

He also provided funds for the activism and legal defense of John Brown, though he deplored Brown's fanaticism and urged against violent resistance to the federal government. When Brown was arrested at Harpers Ferry, Lawrence appealed to the Governor of Virginia to secure a lawful trial.

In 1862, he raised a battalion of cavalry which became the 2nd Massachusetts Cavalry, of which Charles Russell Lowell was colonel.

Personal life
In 1842, Lawrence married Sarah Elizabeth Appleton, daughter of U.S. Representative William Appleton and Mary Ann (née Cutler) Appleton. They had four children:

 Amory Appleton Lawrence (1848–1912)
 William Lawrence (1850–1941), who became the Bishop of Massachusetts.
 Susan Mason Lawrence (1852–1923)
 Harriet Lawrence Hemenway (1858-1960), who became a co-founder of the Massachusetts Audubon Society.

Descendants
Through his son William, Lawrence was the grandfather of William Appleton Lawrence (1889–1968), who was elected third Bishop of the Episcopal Diocese of Western Massachusetts, and Frederic Cunningham Lawrence (1899–1989), a suffragan bishop of the Episcopal Diocese of Massachusetts.

Death and legacy
He died at his summer resort in Nahant, Massachusetts, in 1886.

Legacy
Lawrence is credited with founding an Episcopal church in Boston, Massachusetts, which prompted many Boston Brahmins to convert from Unitarianism. His son, William Lawrence, became the long-time Bishop of the Episcopal Church in Massachusetts.

His alma mater, Groton Academy was later renamed after him. Today, it is the Lawrence Academy at Groton.

Notes

References
 Lawrence Townie history
 History of Cottage Farm, Brookline
 Lawrence, William (1888).  Life of Amos A. Lawrence, with Extracts from his Diary and Correspondence. Boston.
 
 

19th-century American Episcopalians
Bleeding Kansas
Harvard College alumni
Lawrence University
Politicians from Appleton, Wisconsin
People of Massachusetts in the American Civil War
People from Groton, Massachusetts
1814 births
1886 deaths
Massachusetts Whigs
19th-century American politicians
University of Kansas people
19th-century American philanthropists
American abolitionists
Christian abolitionists
American people of English descent